Lang Park, also known as Brisbane Football Stadium, by the sponsored name Suncorp Stadium, and nicknamed: 'The Cauldron', is a multi-purpose stadium in Brisbane, Queensland, Australia, located in the suburb of Milton. The current facility comprises a three-tiered rectangular sporting stadium with a capacity of 52,500 people. The stadium's major tenants are the Brisbane Broncos, Queensland Maroons and Queensland Reds.

Lang Park was established in 1914, on the site of the former North Brisbane Cemetery, and in its early days was home to a number of different sports, including cycling, athletics, and soccer. The lease of the park was taken over by the Brisbane Rugby League in 1957 and it became the home of the game in Queensland (remaining so to this day). It has also been the home ground of major rugby union and soccer matches in Queensland since its modern redevelopment, including the Queensland Reds and the Brisbane Roar, and some Wallabies and Socceroos matches. It hosted the 2008 and 2017 Rugby League World Cup Finals, and the 2021 NRL Grand Final. In addition to this, the ground hosted Rugby World Cup quarter finals and two Super Rugby grand finals, with the Queensland Reds winning on both occasions. The venue will host several matches for the 2023 FIFA Women's World Cup including the third-place match as well as the soccer tournament at the 2032 Summer Olympics, including the gold medal matches in both the men's and women's events.

History

Origins
The site of Lang Park was originally the North Brisbane Cemetery, and until 1875 was Brisbane's primary cemetery. By 1911 the area was heavily populated, so the Paddington Cemeteries Act (1911) was introduced and the site was redeveloped as a recreational site. In 1914 it was fenced off and named Lang Park after John Dunmore Lang.

The ground was leased by the Queensland Amateur Athletics Association (QAAA) in the 1920s. In 1935, the Queensland Soccer Council (QSC) became a sub-tenant of the QAAA, with a view to using it as the home ground for Brisbane soccer fixtures (leaving its former home, the Brisbane Cricket Ground). The Latrobe Soccer Club, in turn, became a sub-tenant of the QSC, using the ground for its home games (see image below).

However, by 1937, the QSC was considering sub-leasing Lang Park to "another code of football" (most likely Western Suburbs Rugby League) as it "was not satisfied with the financial returns ... under the sub-lease to the Latrobe-Milton club". Latrobe in turn responded that "'If no action Is taken to introduce the Ipswich clubs into the Brisbane competition this' season ... the Latrobe-Milton Club cannot accept an increase in rental for Lang Park. Give us competition play with Ipswich and my club will hold the ground as headquarters for the code."

On 11 February 1950, the official opening of the Lang Park Police Citizens Youth Club took place and youth activities commenced because of the concerns with the increase of juvenile delinquency. Activities such as boxing, wrestling, basketball and gymnastics all occur at these premises to this day.
Contemporaneous records are scant, but it appears the QSC did not renew the lease the ground after the intervening World War II. In 1953 the Brisbane Rugby League (BRL) amalgamated with the Queensland Rugby League (QRL). QRL secretary Ron McAullife negotiated a 21-year lease of Lang Park from the Brisbane City Council in order to give the QRL a financially viable base of operations. The park had only the most basic facilities, and the QRL contributed £17,000 to its development. Lang Park hosted its first game of first grade rugby league during the 1930s, with regular BRL games commencing there in 1955. In 1958 it hosted its first Brisbane rugby league grand final in which Brothers defeated Valleys 22 points to 7. A record crowd of 19,824 saw Northern Suburbs defeat Fortitude Valley at Lang Park in the BRL grand final in September 1961.

In the 1960s, Fonda Metassa famously burst from the back of an ambulance to return to the field after being carted off injured in a match for Norths against Redcliffe. As the ground was used increasingly by the QRL, it became no longer viable for use as a public recreation facility due to spoilage of the running track. In 1962 the Lang Park Trust was created under an act of Parliament. This allowed for the construction of the Frank Burke Stand (1962), Ron McAuliffe Stand (1975) and the Western Grandstand (1994). The Trust had on its board one member from the Queensland Government, one member from the Brisbane City Council, two members from the Queensland Rugby League and one member from the Brisbane Rugby League.

From the 1960s, Lang Park hosted interstate and international rugby league, including the inaugural State of Origin match. Up until 1972, it was the home ground of the Western Suburbs Panthers.

NSWRL/ARL years
In 1988, the Brisbane Broncos entered the NSWRL Premiership along with the Gold Coast Chargers and the Newcastle Knights. The Broncos played out of Lang Park from 1988 until 1992 when they moved to the 60,000 capacity ANZ Stadium, the stadium for the 1982 Commonwealth Games. The move occurred due to a dispute over the Broncos sponsor, Power's Brewery, being a competitor of the QRL's sponsor XXXX.

In 1995, professional rugby league returned to the ground when the South Queensland Crushers entered the newly formed Australian Rugby League premiership. The Crushers had a fairly average first season, winning six of 22 games and finishing 16th out of 20. Their second season in 1996, began with promise. The team won their first two games and after losing round 3, led big brother Brisbane 8-6 at half time in front of their biggest ever home crowd, 34,263. But the Broncos scored 4 tries in the second half to see the Crushers lose. They only won two more games that year (rounds 13 & 14) and received the wooden spoon, a terrible ending to a season starting with so much promise. Their final season, 1997, saw them compete in the ARL's half of 1997's split competition and they won another wooden spoon, finishing 12th of 12. They were liquidated at the end of 1997 after merger talks with the Gold Coast Chargers broke down.

In 1994, the stadium's name was changed to Suncorp Stadium, when naming sponsorship was attained by Queensland financial institution, Suncorp. The venue is currently managed by AEG Ogden. On 25 May 1997, the 1996/1997 National Soccer League Grand final was played in front of then a capacity crowd of 40,446, where the Brisbane Strikers FC defeated Sydney United FC 2–0.

Redevelopment

In the late 1990s, it was decided that Brisbane needed a state of the art rectangular stadium. Suncorp Stadium was chosen as the site. The $280 million redevelopment commenced in July 2001 after Game One of the 2001 State of Origin series. The redevelopment was completed in time for the match between the Brisbane Broncos and Newcastle Knights on 1 June 2003; Brisbane's first game at Suncorp Stadium since 1996.

The stadium is now a 52,500 state of the art all-seater rectangular stadium, a far cry from the former Lang Park oval with two grandstands set back from a perimeter road. The only remaining stand from before the redevelopment is the Western Grandstand. The extension of the facility resulted in the demolition of a number of buildings along Milton Road, including the former Brisbane City Council trolley-bus depot.

During their relocating year, the Broncos only recorded one win at the venue, against the Sydney Roosters in Round 16, 2003, unlike one loss at their previous home, ANZ Stadium in Round 5, 2003, against the New Zealand Warriors.

Following its redevelopment, questions were raised about the standard of the surface, which was soft underfoot and sandy and was blamed for a spate of injuries to rugby league players using it (temporarily earning the stadium the nickname "Sandcorp Stadium" ). Prior to the redevelopment, the stadium was known as "The Cauldron", and Queensland fans developed a reputation for vocal support of their teams, adding to this mythology.

Suncorp Stadium suffered significant damage during the 2010–2011 Queensland floods with the entire playing field being covered by flood water. An electrical fire started in a transformer room due to water ingress, however there was no major damage from the fire. Brisbane Roar's match with Wellington Phoenix, originally scheduled for the weekend of 14–16 January, was postponed until 26 January, and the remaining Brisbane Roar home matches were moved to Skilled Park on the Gold Coast. Suncorp Stadium was out of action until late February, but restored just in time for the commencement of the 2011 NRL season. Temporary change rooms were set up as the original change rooms were damaged as a result of the floods. The original change rooms were restored in time for the commencement of the 2012 NRL season.

In September 2016, it was announced that the video screens, originally installed in 2003, would be replaced. Construction started on the new video screens in March 2017 and was finished in early May 2017 in time for an NRL double header.

Today

Although the stadium has been the traditional home of rugby league in Queensland, it has also become the state's premier venue for soccer, as well as rugby union.  The re-developed Suncorp Stadium first hosted rugby union games at the 2003 Rugby World Cup and in 2005, the stadium became the new home of the Queensland Reds Super Rugby team when they moved from their former home at Ballymore Stadium. This move caused some disquiet amongst rugby traditionalists, however was accepted by Queensland Rugby Union CEO Theo Psaros, who said that "our hearts may be at Ballymore but our heads say it's time to move.". The year before the Reds' move, the newly established football team Queensland Roar of the A-League also elected to play their home games at Suncorp Stadium.

New Zealand rugby journalist Wynne Gray called Suncorp Stadium perhaps the best rugby stadium in the world.  "It is so intimate you can hear the smack of bodies, the boot on leather, you feel the power and rhythm of the games."

The stadium has also been favourably compared to Cardiff's Millennium Stadium and London's Twickenham Stadium.

On 29 July 2006, the Bledisloe Cup clash between the Wallabies and the All Blacks returned to Brisbane for the first time in over a decade for the 2006 Tri Nations Series. Though Australia narrowly lost the match, the game saw a new ground record set.

A month later on 7 October the stadium hosted a 1–1 friendly soccer game between Australia and Paraguay in which Tony Vidmar, Stan Lazaridis, Zeljko Kalac and goal scorer Tony Popovic all retired from international football.

On 8 November 2006, a crowd of 44,358 at Suncorp Stadium saw the Great Britain national rugby league team play against Australia for the last time.

On Wednesday 13 and Thursday 14 December, Suncorp Stadium hosted its first music concert since the 1980s and the stadium's redevelopment when Robbie Williams performed in front of two 52,413 sell-out crowds during his "Close Encounters" tour of Australia, and was the venue for the U2 360 tour in December 2010. That same month the stadium hosted Bon Jovi as part of The Circle Tour.

Suncorp Stadium was also the site of the 2011 A-League Grand Final, drawing a crowd of over 50,000 for the climactic football event. The match was one of the dramatic in A-League history, with the Brisbane Roar scoring two goals in the last five minutes to level the scores with the Central Coast Mariners after several hundred home supporters had left the stadium early, many returning after hearing the stadium erupt while waiting for the train. The Roar went on to win 4–2 in the penalty shootout, making for an incredible victory.

The stadium is also home to the Lang Park Police Citizens Youth Club.

American Singer-Songwriter Taylor Swift played at Suncorp Stadium for her Red Tour on 7 December 2013.

In 2019, Suncorp Stadium hosted the NRL's inaugural Magic Round, in which all eight matches in a single round are played at the one venue.

In 2020, the Melbourne Storm played their "home" finals at the venue, as it was not possible for the team to play them at its regular home ground, AAMI Park, due to the state of Victoria being locked down during the state's second wave of coronavirus infections.

On 26 June 2021, the Queensland Maroons played at home against the New South Wales Blues in the State of Origin series. Queensland lost the game 26-0, and henceforth the series.

Due to a COVID-19 lockdown in New South Wales, which began on 26 June 2021 and was still in effect into October, the stadium hosted the 2021 NRL Grand Final on 3 October 2021. This was the second time that a rugby league premiership Grand Final was played outside of Sydney, following the 1997 Super League Grand Final.

Average attendance per team

Popular culture

In the 1980s, Brisbane rugby league icon Wally Lewis became known as The Emperor of Lang Park after his performances in State of Origin matches played at the ground. Brisbane-based beer XXXX, which is brewed at the nearby Castlemaine Brewery, ran a television advertisement celebrating this title in song:

In 2006, Queensland Minister for Sport, Tom Barton introduced the Stadium's Sports Media Hall of Fame which honours the achievements of media representatives who have covered the two major football codes (Rugby league and Rugby union) played at this historic ground over the past 40 years. So far, there are five inductees: rugby league commentator George Lovejoy, rugby league journalists Jack Reardon and Steve Ricketts, Gerry Collins and Frank O'Callaghan.

Statues
There are bronze statues outside the stadium. So far, all of them are of rugby players:
 Wally Lewis (Rugby league) 
 Darren Lockyer (Rugby league) 
 Mal Meninga (Rugby league)
 Arthur Beetson (Rugby league)
 John Eales (Rugby union)
 Allan Langer (Rugby league)

Awards 
In 2009, as part of the Q150 celebrations, Suncorp Stadium (Lang Park) was announced as one of the Q150 Icons of Queensland for its role as a "structure and engineering feat".

Concerts

Accessibility
Controversially, the redevelopment was the first major sporting facility in Australia with no car parking, primarily due to concerns with traffic congestion in the surrounding residential neighbourhood. Instead, the stadium's is surrounded by pubs, restaurants, cafes, bars and the XXXX brewery. This together with dedicated pedestrian links to Milton railway station and Brisbane CBD adds to the match day experience and is seen as a model for new stadiums and large entertainment venues. The stadium redevelopment has been the catalyst for the Barracks urban renewal development at Petrie Terrace midway along the dedicated pedestrian link to the CBD.

Facts

2015 AFC Asian Cup

2023 FIFA Women's World Cup

Controversies
On Saturday, 16 June 2011, The Weekend Australian revealed that Suncorp Stadium was in danger of either losing the hosting rights to all Queensland based NRL finals matches to Sydney, or having its capacity limited to 25,000 seats, due to a condition included in the legislation regarding the Stadium's redevelopment that only 24 'special events' (i.e. with attendance in excess of 25,000) a year can hosted at the venue. This number of special events was reached when the Brisbane Broncos faced the Manly Sea Eagles in Round 26 of the 2011 NRL Telstra Premiership Season. On 6 September 2011, legislation was passed to lift the crowd capacity limit to 35,000 for those 24 events, enabling the Broncos to host finals matches should they progress that far.

The stadium's grass quality was criticised by coaches and players during 2015 AFC Asian Cup.

Rugby league test matches
The venue has hosted forty-one Australia internationals. The results were as follows;

It also hosted three non Australia matches. Incidentally, they were all England matches. The first was a 1975 Rugby League World Cup match against Wales on 10 June 1975 with 6,000 in attendance and lost 12 - 7. The second was a 2008 Rugby League World Cup match against New Zealand on 15 November 2008 with 26,659 in attendance and lost 32 - 22. The third and final to date was a 2014 Four Nations match between against Samoa with 47,813 in attendance and was a double header which was followed by the Australia New Zealand match. England won 32 - 26.

Suncorp Stadium will host two matches of the 2017 Rugby League World Cup. The venue will play host to the first semi-final on 24 November and the tournament final on 2 December.

Rugby Union Internationals

Football men's internationals

Football women's internationals

Boxing
Suncorp Stadium was the host of the Manny Pacquiao vs. Jeff Horn fight for the WBO welterweight championship with 51,052 people in attendance.

References

52. https://www.nrl.com/news/2021/06/21/maroons-v-blues-state-of-origin-ii-preview/

External links

 

Sports venues in Brisbane
A-League Men stadiums
Soccer venues in Queensland
Boxing venues in Australia
Rugby league stadiums in Australia
Rugby League World Cup stadiums
Rugby union stadiums in Australia
Rugby World Cup stadiums
History of Brisbane
Brisbane Roar FC
Brisbane Broncos
Queensland Reds
Queensland rugby league team
Sports venues completed in 1914
Milton, Queensland
1914 establishments in Australia
Former cemeteries
Q150 Icons
Music venues in Australia
2023 FIFA Women's World Cup stadiums
Venues of the 2032 Summer Olympics and Paralympics
Dolphins (NRL)